A chinaman  is a dealer in porcelain and chinaware, especially in 18th-century London, where this was a recognised trade; a "toyman" dealt additionally in fashionable trifles, such as snuffboxes.  Chinamen bought large quantities of Chinese export porcelain and Japanese export porcelain landed by the East India Company, who held auctions twice a year in London.  The traders then distributed chinaware throughout England.

Imports from China declined at the end of the 18th century.  Domestic production by the English potteries became large and the manufacturers, such as Mason and Wedgwood, became successful and supplied their own retail businesses.

Chinaware
Chinese porcelain was imported into England from the 1680s.  London was the main port where between one and two million pieces were landed each year.  These were sold at auction by the East India Company and the resulting trade made London the hub for distribution of chinaware throughout the country.  London remained the centre of the trade even after large scale production started in the English provinces, especially the Staffordshire Potteries.  This was because of the continuing import/export business and the concentration of artistic talent and the cream of society there.

Trade
The occupation of chinaman was documented by A General Description of All Trades in 1747: "This business is altogether shopkeeping, and some of them carry on a very considerable Trade..."  The cost of becoming an apprentice was usually £20 to £50 but could be as much as £200.  A journeyman was given wages of £20 to £30 a year plus board.  The value of the stock in trade would typically be £500 but a prosperous merchant might have stock valued at £2,000 or more.

One prominent chinaman of this well-to-do sort was James Giles who had premises in Soho and a fashionable showroom near Charing Cross.  In the 1760s, Josiah Wedgwood was the first of the English potters to open his own showroom in West End of London rather than making bulk sales to the trade (as well as commissions for large services); eventually others followed.  The retail side of Wedgwood's operation was run by his partner — the cultivated merchant, Thomas Bentley.  Bentley opened a showroom on the corner of St Martin's Lane, then moved to Greek Street in Soho and opened further showrooms in other fashionable places such as Bath.

Competition
In 1785, they formed a trade association called the China Club.  Collusion developed at the biannual auctions of the East India Company from about 1779.  This auction ring depressed the prices obtained at auction and so the trade became unprofitable.  The import duty on tea was reduced from 119% to 12.5% in 1784.  This increased the demand for tea and so it became the preferred cargo. In 1791, the Court of Directors ordered that, henceforth, china was only to be carried as ballast on their vessels.  This reduced the import trade considerably and so, in 1795, the chinaman Miles Mason of Fenchurch Street, asked whether the company would carry private shipments of china for a carriage fee.  They declined and Mason went on to develop a business in Liverpool and then Staffordshire.

Mason wanted to develop a method of making replacement pieces for existing sets of china.  His experiments led to the development of a type of pottery which, like Chinese porcelain, was strong and so resisted chipping.  This was ironstone china which developed into a substantial business under his son, Charles, who patented the process.  Many other potteries in England copied this style and large quantities were exported to other countries such as France and the United States.  The original trade in imports from China ceased in 1798 as the East India Company stopped making bulk sales.

See also
Worshipful Company of Glass Sellers

References

Citations

Sources

Economic history of England
Chinese porcelain
British porcelain
English merchants